The University of Pennsylvania Journal of Law and Social Change (JLASC) is an official student-run journal of the University of Pennsylvania Law School.

Overview
JLASC espouses an interdisciplinary scholarly approach dedicated to challenging social injustice.  This broad mission attracts articles from a diverse range of legal scholars, practitioners and activists around the country.  JLASC publishes four editions per year and is currently in its twenty-first volume.

Article Selection Process
Among the six official journals of Penn Law, JLASC is unique both in its mission and its democratic article selection process.  All journal members participate in decision-making by collectively reviewing, selecting and editing each piece of scholarship.  Journal members read article submissions as part of a weekly, student-run seminar.  Through debate and discussion, JLASC decides democratically which articles to publish.  Articles embrace theory and practice, featuring scholarship that has practical implications both within and beyond the legal community.

History
The journal was originally established in 1993 under the name HYBRID.

External links 
 

American law journals
University of Pennsylvania Law School
Publications established in 1993
Law journals edited by students
English-language journals
Quarterly journals